Elías Amézaga (1921–2008) was a Spanish writer. He was born in Bilbao on 9 August 1921 and died in Guecho on 13 April 2008.

Education and work
He obtained a law degree from the University of Oviedo. After more than 25 years of research he completed a bio-bibliography of ten volumes entitled Basque authors. He wrote more than sixty plays, essays and biographies on Miguel de Unamuno, Jose Maria Salaverria, Sabino Arana, José Antonio Aguirre, Jose Maria Olivares Larrondo and others.

He is renowned for his immense work in favour of Basque writings, studying any author, regardless of their ideology.

Collaborations
 Literary collaborator on Bilbao Iron and The Voice of Asturias in Oviedo and in Deia
 The Northern Gazette
 The Basque Daily
 The Bilboa Monday Paper
 The Courier
 Journal 16
 Egin
 Muga
 The voice of Vizcaya
 Sancho el Sabio Institute Bulletin 
 Arbola
 Pergola
 The Deusto Letter
 Contemporary History
 Kultura
 The World of the Basque Country
 The Álava Journal

Awards
The Friends of the Country Royal Basque Society and the Basque Studies Society (Eusko Ikaskuntza) recognized the extent of his effort. He was named an emeritus member of the Friends of the Country Royal Basque Society and received the Lekuona Manuel Award from the Basque Studies Society in 2005. The Bilbao City Council, meanwhile, named him distinguished Villager in 2001.

Other recognition
He died in his house at the Guecho tower on 13 April 2008 at 86 years of age.

Three biographies have been written about this author
 Elias Amezaga, writer of the Basque people (Madrid, 1990) by Mario Angel Marrodán
 Elías Amezaga Urlezaga. (San Sebastián, 2006) by Abraham Amezaga (grandson of Elías Amézaga
 Elías Amezaga: Life and Work, (San Sebastián, 2009) by Abraham Amezaga.

He was honoured with a tribute on April 13, 2011 (the anniversary of his death), via the establishment of the First Elias Amezaga Prize. The first winner was Arrola Ildefonso, playwright and Bilboan journalist, who was also a personal friend of the honoree.

References

External links
 Official website
 News of Elías Amézaga's death
 Obituary published in El Mundo

Basque-language writers
1921 births
Spanish essayists
2008 deaths
People from Bilbao
Basque writers
University of Oviedo alumni
Spanish male dramatists and playwrights
20th-century Spanish dramatists and playwrights
Male essayists
20th-century essayists
20th-century Spanish male writers